Sapieha Palace is one of the palaces in Warsaw New Town district of Warsaw, Poland. Started by the powerful Sapieha family who gave the name to the building, it currently houses the Environmental Protection School Complex.

History

18th century 
The palace, commissioned by Jan Fryderyk Sapieha, Chancellor of the Grand Duchy of Lithuania, was built in Rococo style in 1731-1746 by Johann Sigmund Deybel. It was constructed as a French-style city palace, so-called Hôtel particulier. At that time it consisted of five-axial main buildings (corps de logis) and two outbuildings between the palace and a street. Between 1741 and 1742 the existing one-story outbuilding was connected with the main outbuilding of the palace complex, and between 1771 and 1790 another wing was erected to connect the inhabited corps de logis with the second outbuilding.

19th century 
In 1818–1820 the palace was converted into the Sapieha Barracks (Koszary sapieżyńskie) for the use of the army. The Neo-Classical remodelling in the early 19th century was the work of Wilhelm Henryk Minter. During the November Uprising of 1830–1831 it served as the barracks for the famous Polish 4th Infantry Regiment (Czwartacy).

20th century 
Destroyed in 1944 by German occupying forces, it was rebuilt in the 1950s by Maria Zachwatowiczowa.

References

In-line:

See also

 Sapieha Palace, Lviv
 Sapieha Palace, Vilnius

Palaces in Warsaw
Rococo architecture in Warsaw
Rebuilt buildings and structures in Poland
Baroque palaces in Poland